Zabari-ye Yek (also Romanized as Zabārī-ye Yek; also known as Shaikh Zibāri, Sheykh Zabārī, Sheykh Zebārī, Sheykh Zīārī, Zabārī, and Zobārī) is a village in Miyan Ab Rural District, in the Central District of Shushtar County, Khuzestan Province, Iran. At the 2006 census, its population was 174, in 30 families.

References 

Populated places in Shushtar County